John Douglas Reynolds  (born January 19, 1942) is a former Canadian politician. He was the member of Parliament for the riding of West Vancouver—Sunshine Coast—Sea to Sky Country in the House of Commons of Canada from 1997 to 2006 and a former Federal Opposition Leader. He had also been an MP in the 1970s as well as a provincial politician in British Columbia in the 1980s and 1990s.

Life and career
He was first elected to Parliament as a candidate of the Progressive Conservatives in 1972 and was re-elected in 1974. He resigned in 1977 after a series of disagreements with Joe Clark.

Beginning in 1983, he was active in the Social Credit Party of British Columbia and served as speaker of the British Columbia Legislative Assembly and as a cabinet minister. In 1986, he was a candidate at the Social Credit leadership convention coming in fifth. He remained in provincial politics until 1991 when he was defeated in his bid for re-election.

Reynolds returned to parliament in 1997 as a Reform MP and served as Chief Opposition Whip. He remained in this role when the Reform Party was folded into the Canadian Alliance.  When Stockwell Day faced a revolt in his caucus in 2001 and Chuck Strahl resigned as House leader, Reynolds was named in his place. When Day resigned as Alliance leader, Reynolds was chosen as interim party leader and leader of the opposition and served until Stephen Harper was elected the new party leader.

Reynolds resigned as House leader on January 24, 2005, but continued as MP for his riding until his retirement at the 2006 federal election. He was the coordinator of the Conservative campaign in British Columbia. On the day after the election, which resulted in a Conservative minority government, Harper asked Reynolds to approach Liberal minister David Emerson about crossing the floor and serving as a minister in Harper's government. Emerson eventually accepted the offer, which triggered a firestorm of criticism.  However, Reynolds, who had strongly criticized Belinda Stronach's switch from the Conservatives to the Liberals, told a suburban Vancouver newspaper that he was "very happy" that Emerson was a Conservative and claimed that the people of Emerson's left-leaning Vancouver riding got the better end of the bargain. "Instead of having someone in opposition," he said, "they have someone who is a cabinet minister of a new government."

Reynolds supports the death penalty.

References

External links

1942 births
Living people
British Columbia Social Credit Party MLAs
Canadian Alliance MPs
Conservative Party of Canada MPs
Leaders of the Opposition (Canada)
Members of the Executive Council of British Columbia
Members of the House of Commons of Canada from British Columbia
Members of the King's Privy Council for Canada
Politicians from Toronto
Progressive Conservative Party of Canada MPs
Reform Party of Canada MPs
Speakers of the Legislative Assembly of British Columbia
21st-century Canadian politicians